Naphtali Daggett (September 8, 1727 – November 25, 1780) was an American academic and educator. He graduated from Yale University in 1748. Three years later, he became pastor of the Presbyterian Church in Smithtown, Long Island.  In 1755, the Yale Corporation persuaded him to return to  New Haven to assist President Thomas Clapp in the pulpit, and to be considered for appointment as a college professor. On March 4, 1756, the Corporation inducted him as Yale's first professor—officially the Livingstonian Professor of Divinity.

Daggett became the college's president pro tempore in 1766 after the resignation of President Clap.  Daggett held the office of President for the next eleven years, until 1777.

When the British attacked New Haven in 1779, Rev. Daggett took up arms in defense but was taken prisoner and forced to serve as a guide. He was bayoneted by his captors, and died in 1780.

Notes

References
 Kelley, Brooks Mather. (1999).  Yale: A History. New Haven: Yale University Press. ;  OCLC 810552
 Steiner, Herbert Christian. (1893). History of Education in Connecticut,  Circular of Information of the Bureau of Education, No. 2, 1893: Contributions to American Educational History, No. 14. Washington, D.C.: U.S. Government Printing Office.
 Welch, Lewis Sheldon and Walter Camp. (1899).  Yale, Her Campus, Class-rooms, and Athletics. Boston: L. C. Page and Co.  OCLC 2191518

1727 births
1780 deaths
Presidents of Yale University
Clergy in the American Revolution
United States military personnel killed in the American Revolutionary War
People of colonial Connecticut
Burials at Grove Street Cemetery